Firebase Pace is a former U.S. Army firebase near the Vietnam-Cambodia border north-northwest of Tây Ninh, Vietnam.

History
Pace was located approximately 1km from the Cambodian border and 4km northwest of Thien Ngon. 

On 26 September People's Army of Vietnam (PAVN) forces conducted rocket and sapper attacks against ten Army of the Republic of Vietnam (ARVN) bases and Pace all near the Cambodian border. 230 PAVN and 27 ARVN were killed in the attacks.

On 9 October five U.S. soldiers at the base refused to undertake a patrol outside the perimeter of the firebase. The combat refusal was widely reported by the media as was a letter signed by 65 American soldiers at Pace to Senator Edward Kennedy protesting that they were being ordered to participate in offensive combat operations despite U.S. policy to the contrary. 

On 13 October a U.S. AH-1 Cobra gunship was shot down near Pace. By 18 October the PAVN bombardment of Pace had continued for its 23rd consecutive day. On 22 October U.S. forces withdrew from Pace, leaving the base and its four guns to an ARVN Airborne battalion which took over the base. In four separate actions around Pace the ARVN reported killing 47 PAVN.

References

Installations of the United States Army in South Vietnam
Buildings and structures in Tây Ninh province